Daisy Masterman (born 6 April 1990 in Melbourne, Victoria, Australia) is an Australian actress.

Private life
Masterman graduated from Methodist Ladies' College, Melbourne in 2008. During her time in high school she was involved in school plays and took drama lessons as a hobby, but it was only after she left that she decided to start pursuing acting further. She went on to receive a Bachelor of Performing Arts from the University of Ballarat Arts Academy. She has appeared in many commercials for brands such as Tetley and Cadbury. Along with acting Daisy loves figure skating and has appeared on The Today Show and The David and Kim Show as an exhibitionist skater. She also is a big animal lover and animal rights activist.

Career
After having done a few commercials and appearances Masterman went on to receive the role of Sydney Sage in the book trailers of Bloodlines which is the sequel series to the Vampire Academy novels.

Masterman also played a supporting role in the 2013 Australian feature film, MurderDrome, a comical slasher film that she had to learn to roller skate and play roller derby for. She went on to work with MurderDrome director, Daniel Armstrong again in his 2015 film Sheborg Massacre, this time as the lead role of Eddie.

She also voices the lead character 'Love' in the Gwen Stefani cartoon, Kuu Kuu Harajuku.

Filmography
 Nova Star (2019) ... Mack
 Underbelly Files: Chopper (2018) ... Casino Girl
 Tarnation (2017) ... Oscar
 Sheborg Massacre (2016) ... Eddie
 Kuu Kuu Harajuku (2015 - 2018) ... Love (voice)
 The Ruby Circle (2015) ... Sydney Sage
 Complicity (2015) ... Daisy
 Silver Shadows (2014) ... Sydney Sage
 MurderDrome (2014) ... Princess Bitchface
 The Fiery Heart (2013) ... Sydney Sage
 The Indigo Spell (2012) ... Sydney Sage
 The Golden Lily (2012) ... Sydney Sage
 Bloodlines (2011) ... Sydney Sage

References

External links
http://www.daisymasterman.com/about

http://www.imdb.com/title/tt2338708/
http://www.imdb.com/title/tt5196516/?ref_=fn_al_tt_2
https://www.screenaustralia.gov.au/find-a-film/detail.aspx?tid=33989&

1990 births
Living people
Australian film actresses